Gutulisjøen is a lake in Engerdal Municipality in Innlandet county, Norway.

See also
List of lakes in Norway

References

Engerdal
Lakes of Innlandet